David Hoff (born October 22, 1967) is an American ice-sledge hockey coach. Hoff was part of the United States ice sledge hockey team who won gold at the 2018 Winter Paralympics.

References

1967 births
Living people
American sports coaches